Cergy Pontoise Football Club is a football club based in Cergy-Pontoise, France. Founded in 2005, the club competes in the Régional 1, the sixth tier of French football, as of the 2021–22 season. The club's colours are blue and white.

History 
In 1905, Union Sportive Pontoisienne became the seventh club registered in the French Football Federation. In 1936, the club gained professional status, participating in the 1936–37 Division 3, a league that was abolished at the end of the campaign. The club subsequently returned to its amateur status. In 1947, a merger with Olympique de Saint-Denis created Olympique de Pontoise. The club again merged in 1984, this time with ASAN Football, to form Olympique de Cergy-Pontoise.

In 2005, Cergy Pontoise Football Club was formed following a merger of Olympique de Cergy-Pontoise and Union Sportive Cergy Clos.

Cergy Pontoise reached the seventh round of the Coupe de France for the first time in the club's history in the 2021–22 edition of the competition.

Notable former players 

  Sékou Baradji
  Yarouba Cissako
  Adon Gomis
  Lary Mehanna
  Kévin Monzialo
  Niels Nkounkou
  Nsana Simon

References 

Cergy-Pontoise
Sport in Val-d'Oise
Football clubs in France
Association football clubs established in 2005
2005 establishments in France
Football clubs in Île-de-France